The long-tailed spiny rat (Proechimys longicaudatus) is a spiny rat species found in Bolivia, Brazil and Paraguay.

Description
The fur is less bristly than in other related species. The upper parts are a glossy chestnut colour becoming more orange on the flanks. The underparts are white, and there is a clear line separating upper and lower parts. The tail is chestnut above and pale below. The tails are missing on some individuals, reflecting the lizard-like ability of many echimyids to detach their tails when attacked by predators.

Distribution and habitat
This species has a range in South America extending from southern Bolivia and northern Paraguay to western and central Brazil. It is terrestrial and inhabits dry primary and secondary forest, as well as cerrado and habitats with cleared areas and patches of forest.

Ecology
A study was undertaken in Bolivia to establish which small rodents were reservoir hosts for Leishmania, the causal agent for the human disease leishmaniasis. It was found that Oryzomys nitida and Oryzomys acritus were often implicated but that P. longicaudatus did not harbour the infection.

Phylogeny
Morphological characters and mitochondrial cytochrome b DNA sequences showed that P. longicaudatus belongs to the so-called longicaudatus group of Proechimys species, and shares closer phylogenetic affinities with the other members of this clade: P. brevicauda and P. cuvieri.

Status
The long-tailed spiny rat is a common and adaptable species, being able to tolerate some degree of habitat modification. The dry forests in this part of South America are being cleared for agricultural purposes and it is thought the population trend of this rat is downwards. However, it has a wide range, and a presumed large total population, and the rate of decline is slow, so the International Union for Conservation of Nature has rated its conservation status as being of "least concern".

References

Proechimys
Mammals of Bolivia
Mammals of Brazil
Mammals of Peru
Mammals of Paraguay
Rodents of South America
Mammals described in 1830
Taxa named by Johann Rudolph Rengger